Cross County is a rural Northeast Arkansas county in the Arkansas Delta. Created as Arkansas's 53rd county on November 15, 1862, Cross County contains four incorporated municipalities, including Wynne, the county seat and most populous city. It is named for Confederate Colonel David C. Cross, a political leader in the area.

The county is largely flat and fertile, mostly used for row agriculture typical of the rich alluvial soils of the Arkansas Delta. Crowley's Ridge, a forested deposit of loess hills rising from the flat Delta bisects the county from north to south, including part of Wynne and most of Village Creek State Park, the county's primary protected area of ecological value. Historical and cultural features range from Parkin Archeological State Park, which preserves a prehistoric Native American mound building settlement, to the Johnston Cotton Gin marking mechanization of the cotton farm, and the Northern Ohio School, a segregated school built by a lumber company for African-American children of employees. 

Cross County occupies 622.33 square miles (1,612 ha) and contained a population of 16,833 as of the 2020 census. The economy is largely based on agriculture. Poverty and unemployment rates are above national averages, household incomes are below state and national averages. Politically, Cross County has transitioned from reliably Democratic to steadily Republican since the mid-20th century.

Cross County is mostly served by two school districts: Cross County School District and Wynne Public Schools. Higher education is provided at the Wynne campus of East Arkansas Community College, a public community college. Crossridge Community Hospital in Wynne is a community hospital providing primary care in the county. Although no Interstate highways serve Cross County, the county has access to two United States highways (US Highway 49 [US 49] and US 64) and thirteen Arkansas state highways. Cross County is also served by one public owned/public use general aviation airport, Wynne Municipal Airport, and seven community water systems provide potable water to customers in the county.

Geography

Cross County is established on the rich, fertile, alluvial soils of the Mississippi Alluvial Plain. In Arkansas, this region is called the Arkansas Delta (in Arkansas, usually referred to as "the Delta"), having a distinct history and culture from adjacent regions. Bisecting the county from north to south is Crowley's Ridge, a geologic anomaly rising from the Delta composed of loess soil and generally remains covered in oak-hickory forest. Today, the majority (68 percent) of the county is used for row agriculture.

Roughly the western third of the county is within the Western Lowlands Pleistocene Valley Train subregion of the Delta. This region is characterized as flat windblown deposits of silty, sandy soils, and loess with a high groundwater table. Post oak and loblolly pine are native in the higher elevations, with overcup  oak, water hickory, willow oak, and pin oak and pondberry native in wetlands. Today, row agriculture is extensive (mostly soybeans and cotton), with commercial aquaculture (crawfish, baitfish, and catfish farms) also common.

Crowley's Ridge is a series of loess hills more closely associated with the Appalachian Mountains of Tennessee and Kentucky than the Delta country surrounding it. Crowley's Ridge remains largely wooded with oak-hickory forest or beech–maple forest, with little land in cultivation. Forests are related to the Appalachian cove forests, with post oak, blackjack oak, southern red oak, white oak, beech and sugar maple forest standing in contrast to the southern floodplain forests in the rest of Cross County.

The eastern third of Cross County is split between the Northern Holocene Meander Belts and St. Francis Lowlands, both subregions historically influenced by the Mississippi River. Both regions are flat, poorly drained areas consisting of former river channels, drainageways, and floodplains drained in the late 19th century for settlement and row agriculture. Today consisting of farm fields, channelized drainage ditches, levees, the area is predominantly in soybean and cotton cultivation, with some corn, wheat, rice, and sorghum. Remaining natural areas consist of sugarberry, elm, ash tree, pecan, cottonwood, and sycamores. Sandy "Sunk lands" are attributed to the 1811–12 New Madrid earthquakes.

Given Cross County's position along the Mississippi Flyway, many natural areas and grain fields serve as wintering ground for water fowl. Duck hunting is popular in the Delta, including Cross County.

It ranks 49th of the 75 Arkansas counties in area.

Cross County is surrounded by five other Delta counties: Crittended County to the east, St. Francis County to the south, Woodruff County to the west, Jackson County to the northwest, and Poinsett County to the north.

Hydrology

Water is an important part of Cross County's geography, history, and culture. Hydraulically, the county is split into two watersheds by Crowley's Ridge, with the eastern half draining to the St. Francis River or its tributaries, and the western half draining to the L'Anguille River. 

The deep, wide, calm, and navigable St. Francis River has been important for every civilization in Cross County since prehistory. The Casqui tribe settled in the area where the Tyronza River empties into the St. Francis. Today, this settlement is preserved within Parkin Archaeological State Park. Centuries later, European settlers founded Wittsburg as a port city as the northernmost navigable point on the St. Francis a few miles downstream from Parkin, opening the region to regional trade. Within the county, Brushy Creek, Cross County Ditch, Copeland Slough, Prairie Creek, and Village Creek are important watercourses.

Protected areas

The largest protected area in Cross County is Village Creek State Park on Crowley's Ridge near Wynne. The park is known as a large section of preserved forest in its natural state within the Delta, a 27-hole golf course, catfish and bass fishing in the two lakes, horseback riding trails, and a hiking trail along the former Memphis to Little Rock Military Road. The Parkin Archeological State Park in Parkin preserves a prehistoric Native American mound building settlement.

The Brushy Creek Wildlife Management Area is a small property reforested in bottomland hardwood forest by the Arkansas Game and Fish Commission near Hickory Ridge. The Arkansas Natural Heritage Commission maintains the Wittsburg Natural Area as natural Crowley's Ridge habitat, but there is no legal public access to the area.

Demographics

2020 census

As of the 2020 United States Census, there were 16,833 people, 6,653 households, and 4,652 families residing in the county.

2000 census
At the 2000 census, there were 19,526 people, 7,391 household, and 5,447 families residing in the county. The population density was 32 per square mile (12/km2). There were 8,030 housing units at an average density of 13 per square mile (5/km2). The racial makeup of the county was 74.80% White, 23.70% Black or African American, 0.23% Native American, 0.31% Asian, 0.01% Pacific Islander, 0.21% from other races, and 0.74% from two or more races.  0.93% of the population were Hispanic or Latino of any race.

There were 7,391 households, of which 34.70% had children under the age of 18 living with them, 55.20% were married couples living together, 14.10% had a female householder with no husband present, and 26.30% were non-families. 23.50% of all households were made up of individuals, and 11.10% had someone living alone who was 65 years of age or older. The average household size was 2.60 and the average family size was 3.07.

27.80% of the population were under the age of 18, 8.50% from 18 to 24, 27.40% from 25 to 44, 22.60% from 45 to 64, and 13.70% who were 65 years of age or older. The median age was 36 years. For every 100 females there were 94.00 males. For every 100 females age 18 and over, there were 89.40 males.

The median household income was $29,362 and the median family income was $34,044. Males had a median income of $27,880 and females $20,133. The per capita income for the county was $15,726. About 16.40% of families and 19.90% of the population were below the poverty line, including 27.90% of those under age 18 and 17.50% of those age 65 or over.

Human resources

Education

Educational attainment in Cross County is typical for a rural Arkansas county: 83.6% of Cross County residents over age 25 held a high school degree or higher and 14.4% hold a bachelor's degree or higher, compared to Arkansas statewide averages of 86.6% and 23.0%. Cross County is significantly below national averages of 88.0% and 32.1%, respectively.

Primary and secondary education

Two public school districts are based in Cross County: Wynne School District and Cross County School District. Almost the entire county is served by one of these districts, except for a small area in the northeast corner served by Earle School District. The two Cross County districts also serve small areas in adjoining counties. Successful completion of the curriculum of these schools leads to graduation from Wynne Senior High School and Cross County High School respectively. Both high schools are accredited by the Arkansas Department of Education (ADE). Cross County HS is part of the New Tech Network.

Higher education

Cross County contains one institution of higher education, the Wynne Campus of the East Arkansas Community College, a public community college based in Forrest City. The Arkansas State University System offers two institutions in the region: Arkansas State University, a public four-year university in Jonesboro, and Arkansas State University Mid-South, a public community college in West Memphis.

Libraries
The East Central Arkansas Regional Library is headquartered at the Cross County Library, 410 Merriman Avenue East in downtown Wynne. The Cross County Library has a branch library at 122 Wilson Street in Parkin.

Public health
The Cross County Hospital was established in 1952 in Wynne, and operated as a county hospital until a lease agreement with Jonesboro-based St. Bernards Healthcare started in 1999. Now known as CrossRidge Community Hospital, the hospital is supported by a 1% sales tax renewed by voters every four years. The nearest Level 1 Trauma Centers are RegionalOne Health Center and Le Bonheur Children's Hospital, both in Memphis.

The county's population is significantly above healthy weight, with 39.4% of adults ranking as obese, above the state average of 35.7%, itself significantly above national average of 29.6%.

Public safety

The Cross County Sheriff's Office is the primary law enforcement agency in the county. The agency is led by the Cross County Sheriff, an official elected by countywide vote every four years. Police departments in Wynne and Cherry Valley provide law enforcement in their respective jurisdictions, with Hickory Ridge and Parkin contracting with the Cross County Sheriff's Office for law enforcement services.

The county is under the jurisdiction of the Cross County District Court, a local district court. Local district courts in Arkansas are courts of original jurisdiction for criminal, civil, small claims, and traffic matters. Local district courts are presided over by an elected part-time judge who may privately practice law. The district court has three departments: Cherry Valley, Parkin, and Wynne. In 2021, the court will be merged into the 25th District state district court, which includes St. Francis County.

Superseding district court jurisdiction is the 1st Judicial Circuit Court, which covers Cross, Lee, Monroe, Phillips, St. Francis, and Woodruff counties. The First Circuit contains five circuit judges, elected to six-year terms circuitwide.

Fire protection is provided by seven agencies in Cross County, together covering the entire county. The four incorporated municipalities provide fire protection beyond their corporate limits. Rural areas are served by the Bay Village Volunteer Fire Department, Fair Oaks Volunteer Fire Department, and Vanndale Volunteer Fire Department. All fire departments in Cross County are volunteer-based, except the Wynne Fire Department.

Culture and contemporary life

Cross County has several facilities, monuments, and museums dedicated to preserving the history and culture of the area. The Cross County Museum, owned and operated by the Cross County Historical Society, preserves and interprets the history and culture of Cross County for visitors. Cross County Historical Society also maintains the New Hope School outside Wynne.

Parkin contains remains of a historic palisaded village with one mound Late Mississippian village, today listed as a National Historic Landmark and interpreted via the Parkin Archeological State Park. Also in Parkin, the Northern Ohio School is a one-room school built by a lumber company to educate the children of African-American employees in the first half of the 20th century.

Wynne was the primary beneficiary of transportation improvements following the Reconstruction era, becoming a commercial hub for Cross County. Many of the historic structures in downtown Wynne were constructed during economically prosperous times on the farm, leading to the construction of ornate homes in the East Hamilton Avenue Historic District. The commercial centers are preserved as the Wynne Commercial Historic District and the Wynne Wholesale Commercial Historic District.

Other cultural points of interest in Cross County include:

Grace Episcopal Church built in 1917
The Woman's Progressive Club has housed the Woman's Progressive Club, Wynne's oldest social club since 1935

Media

The Wynne Progress and the Cross County Times are the county's two weekly newspapers. The county has had several former publications that have closed over the years, including newspapers published at Parkin and Wittsburg.

Cross County is within the Memphis designated market area with the following local TV stations: WREG (CBS), WMC (NBC), WKNO (PBS), WHBQ (Fox), WTWV, WATN (ABC), WLMT (The CW), WBUY, and WPXX (Ion TV).

The county is home to two radio stations: KWYN (92.5 FM) and sister station, KWYN (1400 AM).

Government

The county government is a constitutional body granted specific powers by the Constitution of Arkansas and the Arkansas Code. The quorum court is the legislative branch of the county government and controls all spending and revenue collection. Representatives are called justices of the peace and are elected from county districts every even-numbered year. The number of districts in a county vary from nine to fifteen, and district boundaries are drawn by the county election commission. The Cross County Quorum Court has nine members. Presiding over quorum court meetings is the county judge, who serves as the chief executive officer of the county. The county judge is elected at-large and does not vote in quorum court business, although capable of vetoing quorum court decisions.

Politics
Formerly a strongly Democratic county, it has voted Republican by increasing margins in every election since 2004.

Communities

Cities

 Cherry Valley
 Hickory Ridge
 Parkin
 Wynne (county seat)

Unincorporated communities

 Bay Village
 Birdeye
 Central
 Coldwater
 Colton Crossing
 Duvall
 Ellis Chapel
 Fair Field
 Fair Oaks
 Fitzgerald Crossing
 Flag Lake Crossing
 Fortune
 Gieseck
 Gladden
 Hamlin
 L'Anguille
 Levesque
 McDonald
 McElroy
 Mersman
 Monterey
 Mounds
 Pittinger
 Pleasant Hill
 Princedale
 River Front
 Riverside
 Rose Place
 Smith Chapel
 Smithdale
 Tilton
 Togo
 Twist
 Vanndale
 Wick Mill
 Wilkins
 Wittsburg
 Yarbo Place

Historic communities

Aberdeen
Bellknap
Budsmith
Dunn
Merck
Saint Francis
Turney
Welford
Wrape

Townships

 Bedford (small part of Wynne)
 Birdeye
 Brushy Lake
 Coldwater
 Ellis
 Fair Oaks
 Hickory Ridge (Hickory Ridge)
 Mitchell (Cherry Valley)
 Searcy
 Smith
 Smithdale
 Twist
 Tyronza (Parkin)
 Wynne (most of Wynne)

Infrastructure

Major highways
Cross County is not served by any Interstate highways; the nearest access to the Interstate system is Interstate 40 (I-40) in St. Francis County to the south. Two United States highways serve Cross County: U.S. Highway 49 (US 49) runs north–south in western Cross County; and US 64 runs east–west across the length of Cross County.

Eleven state highways serve the traveling public in the county, varying from short connector routes to long highways traversing the entire county. Highway 1, which runs north–south the length of the Arkansas Delta, essentially bisects the county, serving as a principal arterial through Wynne and connecting Cherry Valley and Vanndale to the state highway system. Highway 42 runs east–west across the northern part of Cross County through Hickory Ridge, Cherry Valley, Birdeye, Coldwater, and Twist. Highway 75 runs north–south though east Cross County, connecting Parkin and Coldwater to I-40 to the south and I-555 to the north.

Highway 163 begins at Wittsburg and runs north along Crowley's Ridge to Birdeye and toward Jonesboro. It is designated as the Crowley's Ridge Parkway, a National Scenic Byway and Arkansas Scenic Byway.

Utilities

Entergy Arkansas is the sole provider of electricity in most of Cross County, with exception of an area northeast of Wynne roughly between Highway 1 and the St. Francis River, which is served by Woodruff Electric Cooperative. Telephone communication service is provided by AT&T, cable television is provided by East Arkansas Video. Centerpoint Energy is the natural gas utility in Cross County.

The Arkansas Department of Health (ADH) is responsible for the regulation and oversight of public water systems throughout the state. Cross County contains seven community water systems. Cross County Rural Water System is the largest by customer count (9276), though it extends into portions of five other counties. Wynne Water Utilities is largest by customers in Cross County (8837), followed by the Vanndale-Birdeye Water Association (2389). Cherry Valley Waterworks, Hickory Ridge Waterworks, Parkin Rural Water Association, and Parkin Water Company are all smaller water systems with under 1000 customers. All use groundwater from various aquifers as source water.

See also
 List of lakes in Cross County, Arkansas
 National Register of Historic Places listings in Cross County, Arkansas

References

Notes

External links
 Cross County Historical Society

 
1862 establishments in Arkansas
Populated places established in 1862